Jalalabad (also Romanized as Jalālābād; also known as Jalālābād-e Pā’īn) is a village in Chahdegal Rural District, Negin Kavir District, Fahraj County, Kerman Province, Iran. At the 2006 census, its population was 201, in 35 families.

References 

Populated places in Fahraj County